Peter Collinson may refer to:

 Peter Collinson (botanist) (1694–1768), English scientist and horticulturalist
 Peter Collinson (film director) (1936–1980), film director
 Pseudonym used by Dashiell Hammett, derived from commonly used stage name 'Peter Collins' meaning 'nobody', Peter Collinson therefore meaning 'Nobody's Son'